Anilingus (from the Latin anus + -lingus, from lingere, "to lick", variantly  spelled "analingus") is the oral and anal sex act in which a person stimulates the anus of another by using the mouth, including lips, tongue, or teeth. It is also called anal–oral contact and anal–oral sex, and is additionally known by slang names.

Health risks include fecal–oral transmission of diseases.

Etymology and alternative names
The term anilingus entered English through the 1899 F. J. Rebman translation of Edition 10 of sexologist Richard von Krafft-Ebing's 1886 book Psychopathia sexualis.

Colloquial names include "rimming", "rim job", "eating ass", or "tossing the salad".

Practice

General
Pleasure for the giver during anilingus is usually based more on the principle of the act. The anus has a relatively high concentration of nerve endings and can be an erogenous zone, and the recipient may receive pleasure from external anal stimulation. The person receiving anilingus is regarded as the passive partner in the act, and the person performing anilingus is the active partner. People may engage in anilingus for its own sake, before anal fingering or penetration, or as part of foreplay. Studies confirm anilingus to be a sexual practice between women, though practiced by a minority only.

Technique
Anilingus can involve a variety of techniques to stimulate the anus, including kissing or licking; it may also involve the tongue moving around the edge of the anus or up and down the insides of the cheeks of the buttocks, and in and out of the anus.

Anilingus can be performed in a number of sex positions including:

 the passive partner is on all fours in the doggy position with the active partner performing anilingus from behind.
 the passive partner is on their back in the missionary position with their legs raised high with the knees drawn towards their chest, and with some sort of support (such as a pillow) under their hips for comfort and to raise their buttocks. With the partner's anus exposed, the active partner kneels between the partner's legs to perform anilingus.
 the passive partner on top in the 69 position. The passive partner may lie down on the active partner in the missionary position, with legs raised high, from the front to raise the partner's buttocks to perform anilingus on the exposed anus.
 often used in combination with the 69 position detailed above, another position has the active partner lying on their back with the passive partner sitting on their face. This position allows the "passive" partner to become more active or even completely dominant as they can now easily gyrate their hips and thrust their pelvis.
 the rusty trombone, in which a male stands while the active partner performs both anilingus from behind, generally from a kneeling position, and also performs masturbation on the standing partner, thus somewhat resembling someone playing the trombone.

Health risks and prevention

Health risk

Anilingus has potential health risks arising from the oral contact with human feces. Diseases which may be transmitted by contact with feces include: bacterial diseases including shigellosis (bacillary dysentery); viral systemic diseases including hepatitis A, hepatitis B, hepatitis C, poliomyelitis, human papillomavirus (HPV) and herpes simplex virus; parasites including intestinal parasites; and infections and inflammations chlamydia infection, gastroenteritis, conjunctivitis, gonorrhea, lymphogranuloma venereum and other sexually transmitted infections.

Applying the mouth to the genitals immediately after applying it to the anus can introduce the bacterium Escherichia coli ("E. coli") into the urethra, leading to a urinary tract infection. HIV/AIDS is not believed to be easily transmitted through anilingus.

Anilingus with a number of casual partners increases the health risks associated with the practice. Generally, people carrying infections that may be passed on during anilingus appear healthy. Parasites may be in the feces if undercooked meat was consumed. The feces contain traces of hepatitis A only if the infected person has eaten contaminated food.

Prevention
Safe sex practices may include thorough washing of the anal region before anilingus to wash away most external fecal particles and reduce the risk of contraction of fecal-sourced infection. An enema can also reduce the risk of direct fecal contact. A dental dam may also be used, and another safe sex practice is to avoid unprotected sex which involves fellatio after anal intercourse.

If the receiving partner has wounds or open sores on the genitals, or if the giving partner has wounds or open sores on or in the mouth, or bleeding gums, this poses an increased risk of sexually transmitted infections. Brushing the teeth, flossing, undergoing dental work, and eating crunchy foods (such as potato chips) relatively soon before or after performing anilingus also increases the risk of transmission, because all of these activities can cause small scratches on the inside of the lips, cheeks, and palate. These wounds, even when they are microscopic, increase the chances of contracting sexually transmitted infections that can be transmitted orally under these conditions.

As punishment
In the United States prison system, performing anilingus on another inmate (known as "tossing a salad" in prison slang) is one way of paying dues or gaining favor.

See also

 Anal eroticism
 Cunnilingus
 Fecal bacteriotherapy
 Felching

References

External links
 Columbia University article on health risks of anilingus

Anal eroticism
Oral eroticism
Sexual acts
Sexual slang
Pornography terminology